The Island is a 1934 German thriller film directed by Hans Steinhoff and starring Brigitte Helm, Willy Fritsch and Hubert von Meyerinck.

The film's sets were designed by the art directors Artur Günther and Benno von Arent. Location shooting took place on the coast of Dalmatia. It premiered at the Ufa-Palast am Zoo in Berlin in August 1934. A separate French version Vers l'abîme was also released.

Plot 
An embassy is isolated like an island in a posh residential area. Among the guests at a reception organized by the embassy is a blackmailer who offers military attaché Captain Rist to buy back secret war plans he had previously stolen from him. Since Rist doesn't know exactly what the plans are, he agrees to meet the blackmailer in the Silvia Bar. It quickly becomes clear to him that the documents on offer are the plans he himself once designed for practice purposes and are completely worthless. Rist quickly realizes that should these documents get into the hands of the press, they could cause considerable damage and seriously jeopardize the good relations of the countries concerned. So he only sees the possibility of agreeing to the blackmailer's offer to buy.

Since Captain Rist does not have the required purchase price of $6,000, he agrees to declare the amount as a gambling debt, which must be paid within 24 hours. Quite surprisingly, however, the police appear in the bar and arrest the blackmailer, who still manages to slip the filled-in promissory note to the bar owner, Silvia. She senses the chance of getting a nice sum of money and goes to the embassy the following day to claim the outstanding amount. Rist asks for an extension of the payment deadline, but the barmaid wants the money immediately. Only now does Rist realize that Silvia has made a mistake, as she believes she is dealing with commercial attaché Raak, whose checkbook is also on the desk. Seeing no other way out, Rist takes the checkbook and writes a check for the amount requested. He forges Raak's signature and gives the check to Silvia, who then leaves the premises.

Since the debit of the large sum means that Raak's account is no longer covered, he becomes aware of the fraud. When the ambassador found out about the incident, he demanded that Raak accept the requested amount on the check so that the embassy and its staff would not be put in a bad light. Raak then asks, his honor violated, to be dismissed from the civil service. The ambassador, now fully examining the situation and realizing that there must be a criminal in his own ranks, calls all the officers together and explains to the assembled crew that he expects the criminal in question to judge himself.

Captain Rist, guilty only to the extent that he carelessly recorded war plans for practice purposes and did not keep them carefully enough, takes all the blame and sees only one way out: he takes his own life by driving his car around a long curve deliberately left the roadway and fell into the sea, where he drowned. He also clears the way for Raak, who is planning a future with the ambassador's daughter.

Cast

References

Bibliography

External links 
 

1934 films
Films of Nazi Germany
German thriller films
1930s thriller films
1930s German-language films
Films directed by Hans Steinhoff
UFA GmbH films
German multilingual films
German black-and-white films
1934 multilingual films
1930s German films